Robin Capell (30 September 1934 – 12 April 2014) was a South African cricketer. He played four first-class matches for Eastern Province between 1955 and 1958.

References

External links
 

1934 births
2014 deaths
South African cricketers
Eastern Province cricketers
Cricketers from Port Elizabeth